The Integration with Britain Party (IWBP) was a political party in Gibraltar. Although it never won an election, it was briefly in power from 1969 to 1972 when Robert Peliza of the IWBP was Chief Minister.

History

The party was established in February 1967 by Robert Peliza, a former member of the Association for the Advancement of Civil Rights (AACR), and called full integration with the United Kingdom, including electing MPs to the British Parliament. In the 1969 elections the AACR emerged as the largest party with seven of the 15 seats in the House of Assembly, with the IWBP winning five and the Isola Group three. Joshua Hassan, the leader of the AACR was unable to get the support of the Isola Group, who supported Peliza and allowed him to form a government.

After the defection of an Isola Group member, Peliza dissolved the House of Assembly in June 1972 and called early elections. Although the IWBP won seven seats, it was defeated by the AACR, which obtained eight seats and 52% of vote, as the Isola Group lost all three seats. The results returned Joshua Hassan to power, leaving Peliza as leader of the Opposition. In October 1972, Maurice Xiberras took over as party and Opposition leader.

The party political stands were mainly two: the parity of wages between the labour force in Gibraltar and that in the United Kingdom and the achievement of the integration with the United Kingdom. Although the struggle on parity was successful, with Gibraltar workers gaining parity in July 1978, the party's main aim of closer links with the UK was dealt a severe blow when in 1975, the British Foreign Office Minister, Roy Hattersley, stated that integration was not acceptable to the British Government. In spite of this, during early 1976, a Gibraltarian cross-party Constitution Committee began to work on a proposal of constitutional changes that involved a further integration of Gibraltar with the United Kingdom. A delegation of the Constitution Committee, comprising Joshua Hassan and Maurice Xiberras visited London in June 1976, but were unable to convince the United Kingdom Government which, in response, issued a memorandum rejecting the proposals.

As a result of the British government's stance, the IWBP was dissolved shortly before the 1976 elections. The AACR won eight seats (with a personal vote of 75.3% for its leader Hassan) and returned to power, although Xiberras was elected as an independent.

Other former IWBP members
Another Chief Minister, Joe Bossano, began his political career in the IWBP, and was elected to the House of Assembly in 1972. However, he left the party in 1975 and  formed the Gibraltar Democratic Movement after the IWBP was dissolved.

References

Sources

Defunct political parties in Gibraltar
Political parties established in 1967
1967 establishments in Gibraltar
Political parties disestablished in 1976